Lalang may refer to:

Operation Lalang, Malaysian police action
Imperata cylindrica, a species of grass called lalang in the Malay language
Boaz Kiplagat Lalang (born 1989), Kenyan runner
Lawi Lalang (born 1991), Kenyan runner
Lalang, Iran, a village in Golestan Province, Iran
Lalang (island), an island in the Federated States of Micronesia